The Young Hegelians, or Left Hegelians (Linkshegelianer), or the Hegelian Left (die Hegelsche Linke), were a group of German intellectuals who, in the decade or so after the death of Georg Wilhelm Friedrich Hegel in 1831, reacted to and wrote about his ambiguous legacy. The Young Hegelians drew on his idea that the purpose and promise of history was the total negation of everything conducive to restricting freedom and reason; and they proceeded to mount radical critiques, first of religion and then of the Prussian political system. They rejected anti-utopian aspects of his thought that "Old Hegelians" have interpreted to mean that the world has already essentially reached perfection.

Left and Right Hegelianism
The German philosophers who wrote immediately after the death of Hegel in 1831 can be roughly divided into the politically and religiously radical 'left', or 'young', Hegelians and the more conservative 'right', or 'old', Hegelians. The Right Hegelians followed the master in believing that the dialectic of history had come to an end—Hegel's Phenomenology of Spirit reveals itself to be the culmination of history as the reader reaches its end. Here he meant that reason and freedom had reached their maximums as they were embodied by the existing Prussian state. And here the master’s claim was viewed as paradox, at best; the Prussian regime indeed provided extensive civil and social services, good universities, high employment and some industrialization, but it was ranked as rather backward politically compared with the more liberal constitutional monarchies of France and Britain.

The Young Hegelians drew on both Hegel's veneration of Reason and Freedom (as the guiding forces of history) and his idea that the 'Spirit' overcame all that opposed reason and freedom. They wanted to overcome the religious dogma and political authoritarianism in Germany at that time. 

It is important to note that the groups were not as unified or as self-conscious as the labels 'right' and 'left' make them appear. The term 'Right Hegelian', for example, was never actually used by those to whom it was later ascribed, namely, Hegel's direct successors at the Fredrick William University (now the Humboldt University of Berlin). (The term was first used by David Strauss to describe Bruno Bauer—who actually was a typically 'Left', or Young, Hegelian.)

History
It was the outcry caused by David Strauss' The Life of Jesus in 1835 which first made the 'Young Hegelians' aware of their existence as a distinct group, and it was their attitude to religion that distinguished the left and right from then onwards (August Cieszkowski is a possible exception to this rule). Despite the lack of political freedom of speech in Prussia at the time, King Wilhelm III, under the influence of his relatively enlightened minister of religion, health and education Altenstein, allowed pretty much anything to be said about religion so long as there was practical obedience to his enforced merging of Calvinism and Lutheranism and spreading of Protestantism in Catholic areas. Thus the Young Hegelians at first found it easier to direct their critical energies towards religion than politics. 

A major consolidator of the Young Hegelian movement was the journal Hallische Jahrbücher (1838–41) (later Deutsche Jahrbücher (1841–43)) which was edited by Arnold Ruge and received contributions from many of the other Young Hegelians (and, in its infancy, Old Hegelians). It attacked Catholicism and orthodox Protestantism but was initially politically moderate, taking the line that Prussia was the embodiment of historical reason, which required that it evolve by peaceful reform towards a bourgeois egalitarian state with a constitutional monarchy, Protestant religion (though without a dominating state church) and freedom of speech. Another nucleus of the Young Hegelian movement was the Doctor's Club in Berlin (later known as 'the Free'), a society of intellectuals founded in 1837 and led by Bruno Bauer who, by 1838, was writing the most anti-Christian pamphlets in Germany at the time.

The radicalization and politicization of the movement occurred when the new king, Frederick William IV, upon whom the Young Hegelians had pinned their hopes of political reform, came to power in 1840 and curtailed political freedom and religious tolerance more than before. In philosophy the radicalization took the form of a breach with Hegel’s doctrine of the Prussian state as the fulfillment of history. In religion it manifested as a rejection of Christianity even in its most diluted pantheistic form and an adoption of atheism (led by Bauer and Feuerbach). In politics the Young Hegelians dropped much of Hegel's political theory and for the most part turned to republicanism – the exceptions being Moses Hess, who mixed Hegelianism with communism, and of course Marx and Engels. In all these areas a central change was the adoption of certain ideas of Johann Gottlieb Fichte, especially the notion that the self-transcendence of the world by man was a possibility and duty, but one that could never be conclusively fulfilled.

Although they spread democratic ideas throughout Germany to some extent, the intellectual exertions of the Young Hegelians failed to connect with or stir any wider social movement, and when the Deutsche Jahrbücher was suppressed in 1843 the movement started to disintegrate.

Philosophy

The Young Hegelians interpreted the entire state apparatus as ultimately claiming legitimacy based upon religious tenets. While this thought was clearly inspired by the function of Lutheranism in contemporary Prussia, the Young Hegelians held the theory to be applicable to any state backed by any religion. All laws were ultimately based on religious tenets.

As such, their plan to undermine what they felt was the corrupt and despotic state apparatus was to attack the philosophical basis of religion.

Main members

David Strauss
David Strauss wrote Das Leben Jesu (The Life of Jesus/The Life of Jesus, Critically Examined) in 1835, in which he argued – in a Hegelian framework – against both the supernatural elements of the Gospel and the idea that the Christian church was the sole bearer of absolute truth. He believed the Gospel stories were mythical responses to the situation the Jewish community at the time found themselves in. The idea that 'infinite reason' or 'the absolute' (i.e. broadly Hegelian notions of God) could be incarnated within a finite human being was particularly absurd. Moreover, the original teachings of Jesus, which were aimed at aiding the poor and downtrodden, had slowly been perverted and usurped by the establishment to manipulate and oppress the populaces of the world by promising them a reward in the afterlife if they refrained from rebellion against the powers that be in this life.

Bruno Bauer
Bruno Bauer went further, and claimed that the entire story of Jesus was a myth. He found no record of anyone named "Yeshua of Nazareth" in any then-extant Roman records. Such citations actually exist, notably by the Roman historian Tacitus in his Annals and the Jewish historian Josephus in his Antiquities of the Jews. Bauer argued that almost all prominent historical figures in antiquity are referenced in other works (e.g., Aristophanes mocking Socrates in his plays), but as he could not find any such references to Jesus, he argued that it was likely that the entire story of Jesus was fabricated.

Ludwig Feuerbach
Ludwig Feuerbach wrote a psychological profile of a believer called The Essence of Christianity (Das Wesen des Christentums). He argues that the believer is presented with a doctrine that encourages the projection of fantasies onto the world. Believers are encouraged to believe in miracles, and to idealize all their weaknesses by imagining an omnipotent, omniscient, immortal God who represents the antithesis of all human flaws and shortcomings. Such view later influenced Karl Marx's thought, who coined the expression "opium of the people" to describe religion in his Critique of Hegel's Philosophy of Right.

Carl  Nauwerck
 was a German orientalist, theologian and lecturer of Hegelian philosophy in Berlin who lost his teaching license along with Bruno Bauer in 1842.

Arnold Ruge
As an advocate of a free and united Germany, Arnold Ruge shared Hegel's belief that history is a progressive advance towards the realization of freedom, and that freedom is attained in the State, the creation of the rational general will. At the same time he criticized Hegel for having given an interpretation of history which was closed to the future, in the sense that it left no room for novelty.

Max Stirner
Max Stirner would occasionally socialize with the Young Hegelians, but held views much to the contrary of these thinkers, all of whom he consequently satirized and mocked in his nominalist magnum-opus Der Einzige und Sein Eigentum (The Ego and Its Own).

Younger members

Karl Marx
Another Young Hegelian, Karl Marx, was at first sympathetic with this strategy of attacking Christianity to undermine the Prussian establishment, but later formed divergent ideas and broke with the Young Hegelians, attacking their views in works such as The German Ideology. Marx concluded that religion is not the basis of the establishment's power, but rather ownership of capital—processes that employ technologies, land, money and especially human labor-power to create surplus-value—lie at the heart of the establishment's power. Marx (and Engels) considered religion as a component of the ideological superstructure of societies, and a pre-rational mode of thought, which nonetheless was wielded by ruling elites to obscure social relationships including the true basis of political power. In this latter sense, he described religion as  "the opium of the people."

August von Cieszkowski

August Cieszkowski focused on Hegel's view of world history and reformed it to better accommodate Hegelian Philosophy itself by dividing it into Past, Present, and Future. In his Prolegomena to Historiosophy, Cieszkowski argues that we have gone from Art (the Past), which was a stage of contemplating the Real, to Philosophy (the Present), which is a contemplation of the Ideal, and that since Hegel's philosophy was the summing-up and perfection of Philosophy, the time of Philosophy was up, and the time for a new era has dawned – the era of Action.

Karl Schmidt
In The Realm of Understanding and the Individual (Das Verstandestum und das Individuum), Karl Schmidt examined the history of Hegelianism and derived the truth that, "I am only myself." At the end of the dialectic, where the individual exists "by grace of spirit, the law of spirit is applied to spirit itself, and is dragged to its grave". The individual remains as the evidence of the dialectic, and where the physical and psychical worlds merge, the individual stands atop the rubble. 
The Individual is different from Stirner's Unique One in that whilst the Unique One's unique nature is derived from comparison, The Individual exists for itself, and is the existence of all ideas- it is nothing more than peculiarity and uniqueness itself.

Karl Schmidt was the last notable Young Hegelian, and arguably the most obscure of the notable Young Hegelians.

Edgar Bauer
Edgar Bauer, 1820–1886, was the younger brother of Bruno Bauer. According to Lawrence S. Stepelevich, Edgar Bauer was the most anarchistic of the Young Hegelians, and "...it is possible to discern, in the early writings of Edgar Bauer, the theoretical justification of political terrorism."

Die Freien 

 (The Free Ones) was a 19th-century circle of Young Hegelians formed at the University of Berlin and gathering for informal discussion over a period of a few years. Its leader was Bruno Bauer, a student who had attended Georg Wilhelm Friedrich Hegel's lectures and was then asked to defend the position of the Old Hegelians against the claims of David Strauss's Life of Jesus. After reviewing the book, Bauer was converted and became even more radical than Strauss, becoming an atheist and arguing that Christianity was not only historically baseless, but it was also irrational and a barrier to progress.

Later in his life, he would disassociate himself from the group.

Meetings 
Attendees included Max Stirner, Bruno Bauer, Arnold Ruge, Friedrich Engels and Karl Marx, among others. Although not much is known about the group, with John Henry Mackay's biography of Max Stirner appearing to be the most authoritative source, involvement appears to have been a formative period for Marx and Engels (who wrote The Manifesto of the Communist Party, Wage-Labour and Capital and The German Ideology shortly after involvement) and Stirner (who wrote The Ego and Its Own around the same time). Consequently, the overall influence of the group to modern political thought can be considered monumental. As a cartoon by Engels shows, their small meetings were also attended by a "secret policeman", reporting on their activities to the authorities. The members of  held widely diverging views and met for the purpose of debate. They did not represent a unified political or ideological outlook, though most of them have subsequently been seen as "Young Hegelians."

They usually met at Hippel's Wine Bar in central Berlin. According to John Henry Mackay's biography of Max Stirner, they were well known for using foul language, at one point resulting in Arnold Ruge chastising them before storming out. Reportedly, there were many women involved with the group, although information only survives for Stirner's second wife, Marie Dähnhardt. Moreover, after the owner stopped lending them money to drink, they resorted to jokingly begging on the street. However, Mackay claims that they drank little and drunkenness was uncommon.

Philosophy 
Marx would not accept that the state was the seat of universality and rationality, i.e. that it was inherently rational; and made it his goal to prove that the difference between civil society, which Hegel held to be the sphere where individual interest is pursued in conflict with the interests of others and the state, where such conflicts are transcended, was in fact misplaced, the goal of the proletariat being in fact to abolish such differences.

Other Young Hegelians had other qualms about Hegel’s philosophy. David Strauss did not accept Hegel’s claims of Christian historicity renouncing any historical basis to Christianity in favour of its demythification, claiming that the stories found in the Bible should be understood as myths "constructed not by individuals but by the earliest Christian communities in response to the teaching of Christ and the Messianic tradition which they had inherited from the Old Testament".

Legacy
The Young Hegelians were not popular at the university due to their radical views on religion and society. Bauer was dismissed from his teaching post in 1842, and Marx and other students were warned that they should not bother submitting their dissertations at the University of Berlin, as they would certainly be poorly received due to their reputations. 

Dudley Knowles argues that the Young Hegelians secularised Hegel's idea of Geist (spirit), removing the religious link. The resulting philosophy ultimately replaces spirit as the subject of history with that of man.

See also

Young Italy
Young America Movement
Karl Friedrich Köppen

Notes

References
 Young Hegelians a brief account by Paul Blackledge from Socialist Review
 The Young Hegelians and Karl Marx by David McLellan
 The Young Hegelians
 Berlin: The Red Room and White Beer by Robert James Hellman
 Marx, the Young Hegelians, and the Origins of Radical Social Theory by Warren Breckman

Further reading
 Rae, John. "The Socialism of Karl Marx and the Young Hegelians," The Contemporary Review, Vol. XL, July/December, 1881.

Georg Wilhelm Friedrich Hegel
 
Hegelianism